The Red and the Black is the debut album by American musician Jerry Harrison, who rose to prominence as a member of the Modern Lovers and Talking Heads. It was released in 1981 by Sire Records. The track "Slink" was performed live by Talking Heads in 1982.

Track listing
All songs written by Jerry Harrison, except where noted. Additional lyrics by Nona Hendryx.

Personnel
Jerry Harrison – vocals, guitar, bass, synthesizer, clavinet, organ, piano, melodica, percussion

Additional musicians
Yogi Horton – drums (tracks 1, 4–9)
John Cooksey – drums (track 2)
Steve Scales – percussion, drums (track 3)
George Murray – bass guitar (tracks 1, 4, 8–9)
Tinker Barfield – bass guitar (tracks 2, 4–5, 8)
Bernie Worrell – organ (track 2), clavinet (tracks 4–5), synthesizer (track 4)
Adrian Belew – guitar (track 2), guitar solos (tracks 1–3, 6–7, 9)
Nona Hendryx – background vocals
Dolette McDonald – background vocals
Koko Mae Evans – background vocals

Technical
Jerry Harrison – producer, mixing, vocal arrangements and production, sleeve design, cover photo
Nona Hendryx – vocal arrangements and production
Dave Jerden – producer, engineer, mixing
Butch Jones – engineer
Eddy Schreyer – mastering
M & Co. – sleeve design
Chris Callis – cover photo

References

1981 debut albums
Sire Records albums
Jerry Harrison albums
Albums produced by Jerry Harrison
albums produced by Dave Jerden